The Hubert & Ionia Furr House is a historic house at 702 Desoto Avenue in Arkansas City, Arkansas.  The -story Dutch Colonial Revival house was built in 1910 by Hubert Furr, a local timber dealer.  It has a basically rectangular plan, with a side-gable roof with flared eaves.  The first floor is built out of decorative concrete blocks, while the gable ends and roof dormers are clad in wood shingles.  There is a porch spanning the front facade supported by fluted Doric columns resting on a low wall of decorative concrete blocks.

The house was listed on the National Register of Historic Places in 2011.

See also
National Register of Historic Places listings in Desha County, Arkansas

References

Houses on the National Register of Historic Places in Arkansas
Houses completed in 1936
Houses in Desha County, Arkansas
National Register of Historic Places in Desha County, Arkansas